London Buses route 15 (Heritage) was a Transport for London contracted bus route in London, England. It ran between Tower Hill and Trafalgar Square, and was operated by Stagecoach London. 
It was a short working of the standard route 15 and was the last preserved AEC Routemaster route.

History
This route and route 9 (Heritage) were announced initially as 'A' and 'B' as short workings on existing routes to avoid any potential complications as Government's legislation requires buses to be fully wheelchair-accessible by 22 October 2014 in the entire United Kingdom. For Transport for London, they aimed to comply earlier with the last non-wheelchair accessible buses withdrawn in June 2008 with two exemptions - the heritage routes. Route 9H was withdrawn in 2014.

One of the two routes, awarded to Stagecoach London, was for services between Trafalgar Square and Tower Hill, covering the most touristy section of route 15 taking in the Tower of London, Monument, St Paul's Cathedral and Trafalgar Square. An extension to the Oxford Street area was excluded due to severe congestion there. The number of the parallel route 15 was adopted for the AEC Routemasters, despite potential for confusion with the main 15.

Ten buses were allocated to the operator; 5 for the daily turnout, 3 operational spares and 2 as a "strategic reserve". Despite having only a couple of weeks to prepare the vehicles after they left normal service, Stagecoach turned out 5 immaculately presented Routemasters for the first day of service, 14 November 2005. The first journey was driven by Peter Hendy, managing director of TfL surface transport.

In April 2008, one of the buses was painted in a special Indian Red and Silver livery, to promote Bow Garage's Centenary. It was first revealed at the London Bus Preservation Trust's Cobham bus rally, and soon after entered regular service.

The buses operated with conductors collecting fares, in cash (until July 2014, when they went cashless along with the rest of the London bus network) or by Oyster card. Travelcards and Bus and Tram passes were also accepted, but contactless payment cards were not.

In 2015, it was revealed that 10 Routemasters were to be refurbished which will include opening windows being refitted. In November of the same year, the frequency of the service was reduced from a bus every 15 minutes to a bus every 20 minutes in an attempt to improve the reliability of the service.

From 2 March 2019, the heritage service was reduced to operate only on weekends and bank holidays, from the last (2019: first) Saturday in March until the last weekend in September.

The route did not operate during 2020 as a result of the COVID-19 pandemic and its contract expired in November of that year and was not renewed. In 2021, Transport for London confirmed that the route would not run again, thus being withdrawn at the end of its contract in November 2020.

Route
Route 15 (Heritage) operated via these primary locations:
Tower of London
Monument station 
Cannon Street station  
Mansion House station 
St Paul's Cathedral
City Thameslink station 
Aldwych
Strand
Charing Cross station  
Trafalgar Square

See also

 List of bus routes in London
 London Buses route 9 (Heritage) - the second heritage service that operated from 2005 until 2014

References

External links

 Timetable

Bus routes in London
Transport in the London Borough of Tower Hamlets
Transport in the City of London
Transport in the City of Westminster